This article displays the qualifying draw of the 2011 Porsche Tennis Grand Prix.

Players

Seeds

Qualifiers

Lucky losers

  Zuzana Kučová
  Beatriz García Vidagany

Qualifying draw

First qualifier

Second qualifier

Third qualifier

Fourth qualifier

References
 Qualifying Draw

2011 - qualifying
Porsche Tennis Grand Prix - qualifying